Kapitan Dranitsyn is a Russian icebreaker, built in Finland for the former Soviet Union. Since October 1995 she has been used as a research vessel by AARI. She also offers excursions in the Arctic Ocean north of Russia.

Layout
Kapitan Dranitsyn is a conventionally propelled icebreaker built for conditions in the Northern Sea Route and the Baltic Sea. In the last few years she has been modified as a passenger vessel, with 49 outside cabins for 100 passengers. Public accommodation includes spacious lounges, bars, a heated swimming pool, gym, sauna, library and a small hospital.

Service
Icebreaker Kapitan Dranitsyn'''s main activity is piloting cargo ships on the Northern Sea route. She has also carried out tourist voyages to Franz Josef Land, Spitsbergen, Novaya Zemlya, and Chukotka, to Bering Strait and even to the North Pole (with the help of a nuclear-powered icebreaker). She has completed research cruises into the Barents Sea, the Bering Sea and the Arctic Ocean.

In 1996, she made the first around-the-world voyage. In the same year, the icebreaker participated in rescuing the German passenger ship , with 135 passengers aboard.

In 2000, the icebreaker made the Arctic around-the-world voyage on the route Hammerfest (Norway) – Keflavik (Iceland) – Stromfiord (Greenland) – Canadian Arctic regions – Alaska – Chukotka - Murmansk. She made research expeditions to the Laptev Sea in 2002, 2003, and 2004, to place and recover moorings in the NABOS project.
In summer of 2002, the Kapitan Dranitsyn took part in shooting an advertising film for the Ford Motor Company in the Spitsbergen Archipelago.

 2017 overwintering in Pevek 

In January 2017, Kapitan Dranitsyn and Admiral Makarov escorted two ice-strengthened cargo ships carrying construction material for berth of the floating nuclear power plant Akademik Lomonosov from Arkhangelsk to Pevek. The mid-winter crossing along the Northern Sea Route was reportedly the first since the Soviet times at this time of the year. However, on the return voyage the convoy encountered a heavy ice barrier at the entrance to Chaunskaya Bay.

Consequently, it was decided that the cargo ships should overwinter in Pevek. In addition, Kapitan Dranitsyn remained in Chaunskaya Bay to ensure their safety. The icebound ships were later connected to shore power and the regional government supplied them with fresh water and provisions.

The three vessels were finally able to leave Pevek in May 2017.

 MOSAiC Expedition 

During the 2019–2020 MOSAiC Expedition, Kapitan Dranitsyn carried out resupply voyages to the ice-locked German polar research vessel Polarstern.

On 3 February 2020, Kapitan Dranitsyn set off for the second resupply voyage to Polarstern that was, at the time, drifting close to the North Pole. As a result, Admiral Makarov'' was dispatched from Murmansk on a refueling mission.

References

External links

 Page devoted to the Kapitan Dranitsyn from VICTORY adventure EXPEDITIONS.
 Page devoted to my Kapitan Dranitsyn trip to Antarctica in 2001 "Quark Expedition in the Kapitan Dranitsyn."

Icebreakers of Russia
Research vessels of Russia
Icebreakers of the Soviet Union
Arctic research
1975 ships
Murmansk Shipping Company
Research vessels of the Soviet Union